Varuna is a village in Mysore district of Karnataka state, India.

Location

Varuna village is located on Tirumakudal Narsipur road at a distance of 13.3 km from Mysore.
The road from Mysore to Tirumakudal Narsipur forks at Varuna junction. The left deviation continues to T.Nrasipura and Somanathpur. The right deviation goes to Varuna and Sutturu Mutt. The road is well maintained in two lanes.

Landmarks

The housing colony called Lal Bahadhur Shastri Nagar is only three kilometers from Varuna village. J.S.S. Layout if within four km distance. Shanthaveri gopal Gowda Nagar is also within four kilometer distance from Varuna. Varuna is surrounded by Nanjangud, T.Narasipur and Shrirangapattana tauks. The nearest cities are Mysore and Nanjangud.

Temples
Sutturu Mutt is the spiritual center of Lingayath community of Karnataka state. The mutt runs more than 300 schools in India and abroad.

Post Office
There is a post office in Varuna and the postal code is 570010.  The post office is called PTC Campus because there is a Postal Training Center here.

Access
The nearest railway station is Mysore. The nearest airport is Mandakali. There are direct roads from Bannur, Mysore, Nanjangud and T.Narasipur.

Education
There is one primary school in Varuna and one high school in Suttur. Colleges are available in Mysore, 13 km away.

Villages and suburbs
 Hosakotal village
 Suttur Mutt
 Dandikere village
 Chikkahalli village

Demographics
Varuna has a total population of 2,350 people in 529 families as per the 2011 census. The literacy is 62%.

Administration
Varuna village is administered by the head of the village locally called as a Sarpanch. The sarpanch is elected democratically every five years. There are a total of 529 houses in Varuna.

Economy
The people of the village are mostly engaged in agricultural work. Some of them work in Mysore city as the distance is only 13 km.

See also
 Sutturu
 Nagarle
Alambur
 Kahalli
 Chikkahalli Choranahalli

References

Villages in Mysore district